John Hanson (August 31, 1922 – December 4, 1998) was a Canadian-born British tenor and actor, who starred in several West End musicals during the 1950s and 1960s.

Born John Stanley Watts in Oshawa, Ontario, Canada, of English parents, who moved back across the Atlantic three years later. He was educated at Dumfries Academy in Dumfries, Scotland. His headmaster recognized his talent as a boy soprano, and recommended him to the Scottish Broadcasting Corporation. It was there that he made his debut, at the age of 12.

His 1960 album, The Student Prince / The Vagabond King peaked at Number 9 in the UK Albums Chart. Hanson was most famous for his role as the "Red Shadow", the hero of the musical The Desert Song, which enjoyed a record-breaking revival at the Palace Theatre in 1967.

He also appeared in the 1973 Christmas Special of the BBC's Morecambe and Wise Show in which he sang "Stout-Hearted Men". He also appeared on BBC TV's long running variety show, The Good Old Days.

Hanson died in December 1998, at the age of 76, in Shepperton, Surrey, England.

References

External links
Obituary, The Independent, 7 December 1998

1922 births
1998 deaths
20th-century English male actors
20th-century English singers
English male musical theatre actors
English male television actors
English tenors
Male actors from Oshawa
Musicians from Oshawa
People educated at Dumfries Academy
Canadian emigrants to the United Kingdom
20th-century British male singers